The End Is Near and It's Going to Be Awesome: How Going Broke Will Leave America Richer, Happier, and More Secure is a 2013 non-fiction book by Kevin D. Williamson about the growing debt crisis in the United States.

Overview
The book details the author's belief that too much government intervention makes the United States worse off, and government operations can be run privately by the people.

Williamson discussed the book on Fox & Friends. The book was reviewed in The Washington Times.

References

Political books
English-language books
Conservative media in the United States
2013 non-fiction books
Broadside Books books